The loop jump is an edge jump in the sport of figure skating. The skater executes it by taking off from the back outside edge of the skating foot, turning one rotation in the air, and landing on the back outside edge of the same foot.  It is often performed as the second jump in a combination.

History

The loop jump was created by German figure skater Werner Rittberger, and is often called the Rittberger in Europe. According to U.S. Figure Skating, the loop jump is "the most fundamental of all the jumps". According to writer Ellyn Kestnbaum, the jump also gets its name from the shape the blade would leave on the ice if the skater performed the rotation without leaving the ice. In competitions, the base value of the single loop jump is 0.50; the base value of a double loop is 1.70; the base value of a triple loop is 4.90; and the base value of a quadruple loop is 10.50.

Firsts

Execution
The loop jump is an edge jump. The skater executes it by taking off from the back outside edge of the skating foot, turning one rotation in the air, and landing on the back outside edge of the same foot. Atlantic Monthly, in its description of all jumps, states, "An easy way to remember this jump is that it's basically a toe loop without the assist of the toe pick". The jump is usually approached directly from back crossovers, which allows the skater to establish their upper body position while gliding backwards on their right outside edge before springing into the air. The loop is more difficult than the toe loop and salchow because the free leg is already crossed at takeoff, so the rotation is begun from the edge of the skating foot and the upper body. The coordination and weight shift does not need to be exact while performing the loop, so many skaters consider it an easier jump than the flip and Lutz. It is often performed as the second jump in a combination because it takes off from the same edge as "the standard jump landing". Kestnbaum states, "The fact that the free leg remains in front makes both controlling the landing of the first jump and generating the lift and rotation for the second more difficult than when a toe loop is used as the second jump". A loop jump is considered incorrectly done if the takeoff is two-footed, meaning that the free foot does not leave the ice before the takeoff.

References

Works cited
 

Figure skating elements
Jumping sports